Don Lennox may refer to:

 Don Lennox (Shortland Street), a character on the TV series Shortland Street
 Don Lennox (rower) (born 1967), Scottish ocean rower